Rudi Mahmutaj (born 15 August 1998) is an Albanian professional footballer who plays as a forward for Albanian club KF Këlcyra and the Albania national under-19 football team.

Club career

Early career
Mahmutaj started his youth career at Luftëtari Gjirokastër youth team in September 2012. With under-19 side, so far in the 2015–16 season he has made 6 appearances and has scored 3 goals.

Luftëtari Gjirokastër
He made it his first professional debut on 30 September 2015 in the 2015–16 Albanian Cup match against Lushnja replacing Fatjon Hyka at half-time in a 3–0 loss.

International career
Mahmutaj was called up to Albania national under-19 football team by coach Arjan Bellaj for a 7 days gathering in Durrës, Albania from 29 August to 5 September 2015.

Career statistics

Club

References

External links
 
 Profile - FSHF

1998 births
Living people
Footballers from Gjirokastër
Albanian footballers
Albania youth international footballers
Association football forwards
Association football midfielders
Luftëtari Gjirokastër players
KF Këlcyra players
Kategoria e Dytë players